The Burmalı Mosque ( or ; meaning "Mosque with the Spiral Minaret") is a 16th-century Ottoman mosque in Şarachane park, Fatih district, Istanbul, Turkey.

Built in 1550 on behalf of Emin Nuretti Efendi, qadi 'asker of Egypt, it is named for its spiraling (burmalı) brick minaret, a copy of a Seljuq design that is unique in Istanbul. The mosque is not domed, but has a pitched porch, which rests on four reused Byzantine Corinthian stone columns. Unusually, the entrance is off-center behind a column. The mosque's interior is undistinguished.

References 

Religious buildings and structures completed in 1550
16th-century mosques
Spiral
Fatih
1550 establishments in the Ottoman Empire